Sean Martin may refer to:

Sean Martin (cartoonist) (born 1960), Canadian cartoonist
Sean Martin (filmmaker) (born 1966), Anglo/Irish writer and director
Sean Martin (musician), Irish member of The Starjets

See also
F. Sean Martin

Shawn Martin, footballer